Allison Jones (born in Amarillo, Texas, on May 12, 1984) is a Paralympic skier and cyclist for the United States of America. She was born with the birth defect proximal femoral focal deficiency (PFFD), which left her without a right femur. She underwent surgery at age 7 months to amputate her right foot, allowing her to more easily wear a prosthetic leg. She received her first prosthetic leg at 9 months of age.  Allison moved from Amarillo, TX to Colorado Springs, CO at age 2 and a half.

Education 
She has a mechanical engineering degree from University of Denver where she received the "Pioneer Award".

Career 
At the 2006 Winter Paralympics she won a gold medal for slalom in the standing category. Before that she had won silver medals in the super-G and the giant slalom in the 2002 Winter Paralympics. She lives in Colorado Springs, Colorado. Most of her Paralympic medals have been at skiing, but she also won a silver medal at the 2008 Summer Paralympics in cycling.

References 

1984 births
Living people
Sportspeople from Colorado Springs, Colorado
Sportspeople from Amarillo, Texas
Paralympic gold medalists for the United States
Paralympic silver medalists for the United States
Paralympic alpine skiers of the United States
Alpine skiers at the 2002 Winter Paralympics
Alpine skiers at the 2006 Winter Paralympics
Alpine skiers at the 2010 Winter Paralympics
Alpine skiers at the 2014 Winter Paralympics
Paralympic cyclists of the United States
Cyclists at the 2008 Summer Paralympics
Cyclists at the 2012 Summer Paralympics
Cyclists at the 2016 Summer Paralympics
University of Denver alumni
American female alpine skiers
UCI Para-cycling World Champions
Medalists at the 2002 Winter Paralympics
Medalists at the 2006 Winter Paralympics
Medalists at the 2014 Winter Paralympics
Medalists at the 2008 Summer Paralympics
Medalists at the 2012 Summer Paralympics
Paralympic medalists in alpine skiing
Medalists at the 2011 Parapan American Games
Medalists at the 2015 Parapan American Games
21st-century American women
Cyclists from Texas